Pilsbryspira aterrima is a species of sea snail, a marine gastropod mollusk in the family Pseudomelatomidae.

Description
The length of the shell varies between 8 mm and 20 mm.

The shell has a very dark chocolate color, with sometimes a narrow white line above the periphery, but this is usually absent. The spire is lengthened or short. The whorls are rudely prominently keeled on the periphery, which is nodulous. 
Below the keel are a few raised revolving lines, occasionally broken up into granules.

The great variation in the proportions of this shell has caused a number of synonyms to be made.

Distribution
This species occurs in the Pacific Ocean from Mazatlan, Mexico to Northern Peru

References

 Sowerby G.B. (1833), Proc. Zool. Soc., p. 138

External links
  W.H. Dall (1909),  Report on the collection of shells from Peru ;Proceedings of the United States National Museum, Vol. 37, pages 147–294, with Plates 20–28
 
 Gastropods.com: Pilsbryspira aterrima

aterrima
Gastropods described in 1834